Jürgen Schröder (born 15 September 1940, Magdeburg) is a German politician who served as a Member of the European Parliament from 1994 until 2009, representing Saxony. He is a member of the conservative Christian Democratic Union, part of the European People's Party.

External links 
 Website of Jürgen Schröder

1940 births
Living people
MEPs for Germany 2004–2009
Christian Democratic Union of Germany MEPs
MEPs for Germany 1999–2004